The Miss Indiana World competition is a beauty pageant that selects the representative for Indiana in the Miss World America pageant.

The current Miss Indiana World is Jessica Hopper of Remington.

Winners 
Color key

Notes to table

References

External links

Indiana culture
Women in Indiana